Pseudanaesthetis rufipennis is a species of beetle in the family Cerambycidae. It was described by Matsushita in 1933, originally under the genus Eupogonius.

References

Desmiphorini
Beetles described in 1933